Tiger Peak is a peak, 1,490 m, standing above the cirque wall near the head of Ludvig Glacier in the central Anare Mountains. The feature is distinguished by stripes of different colored rock; hence the name, applied by the ANARE (Australian National Antarctic Research Expeditions) (Thala Dan), 1962, which explored this area.

Mountains of Victoria Land
Pennell Coast